Starhotels Anderson is a 4 star hotel located next to the central station in Milan, Italy, owned by the Starhotels group. The hotel has 106 rooms, a gym, a spa and 4 conference rooms with an overall capacity of 70. The hotel's restaurant, Black, specialises in a fusion of local and international cuisine.

External links
 Official website

References

Hotels in Milan
Hotel buildings completed in 1963